The SG 550 is an assault rifle manufactured by Swiss Arms AG (formerly a division of Schweizerische Industrie Gesellschaft, now known as SIG Holding AG) in Switzerland. "SG" is an abbreviation for Sturmgewehr ("assault rifle"). The rifle is based on the earlier 5.56×45mm NATO SIG SG 540.

History

Development
In 1978, the Swiss armed forces formulated requirements for a successor to the Stgw 57 battle rifle (known commercially as the SG 510) using the 7.5×55mm GP 11 cartridge. Emphasis was placed on modularity; the weapon family was to include several variants of the base design, including a compact carbine that would be issued to rear-echelon and support troops, command staff, vehicle crews, special forces personnel and paratroopers. Another aim was to reduce the overall weight of the rifle while retaining comparable or improved accuracy out to 300 m. The solicitation was narrowed down to two designs: the W+F C42 (developed by the state-owned Waffenfabrik Bern, using both 6.45×48mm and 5.56×45mm cartridges) and the SG 541 (developed by SIG using the SG 540 as the basis for the SG 541 prototype). In 1981, the experimental 6.45mm GP 80 cartridge was rejected in favor of the more conventional SIG 5.6×45mm Gw Pat 90 round (with a 4.1 g, tombac-jacketed, lead core projectile) that is the Swiss equivalent to NATO's standard 5.56×45mm cartridge.

Production
In February 1983, the decision to adopt the SG 541 was publicly announced (the designation of the rifle was changed in October of the following year to SG 550, while the carbine version became known as the SG 551). Production began in 1986 and four years later the rifle was officially accepted into service in 1990, hence the military designation Stgw 90. Over 600,000 rifles have been delivered since then and production for the military has now ceased.

Design details

Operating mechanism

The SG 550 is a selective-fire 5.56×45mm NATO assault rifle firing from a closed bolt. It has a gas-actuated piston-driven long-stroke operating system derived from the SIG SG 540 series of rifles, which uses burnt powder gases vented through a port in the barrel to power the weapon's moving parts. Once inside the gas cylinder, propellant gases pass through an L-shaped channel machined in the piston head and are directed forward towards the gas valve. The pressure build-up in front of the piston head pushes the piston and bolt carrier rearward. As the piston is driven back, the gas port and the L-shaped channel move out of alignment, cutting off the supply of gas to the cylinder. Surplus gas and powder residues are evacuated through an exhaust port in the gas cylinder. The manually adjustable gas valve has two settings, one for normal operation, and the second setting for use in the presence of heavy fouling or icing.

The rotary bolt locking mechanism consists of two steel locking lugs that engage locking recesses in the breech, and is identical to that used in the SG 540. A spring-loaded extractor is incorporated into the bolt while a fixed protrusion on one of the receiver's internal guide rails ejects the spent cartridge casings.

Features

The rifle is hammer-fired and has a trigger mechanism with an ambidextrous safety and fire selector switch that has 4 settings: "S"—safe, "1"—single fire, "3"—3-round burst and "20"—fully automatic fire. The 3-round burst mode "3" and the fully automatic "20" position can be disabled by a rotating safety guard to avert accidentally activating the continuous fire mode. The trigger is enclosed in a pivoting trigger guard which can be folded down to the left or right side allowing for unhindered operation with winter gloves. The trigger pull is approximately 

The firearm is fed by lightweight 20-round box magazines, 30-, 10- and 5-round magazines are also available. The magazines are molded from a translucent polymer and can be locked together using studs in order to facilitate quicker reloading (Jungle style).

A bolt hold-open device locks the bolt carrier assembly open after expending the last cartridge from the magazine and is released by lifting the bolt catch lever located on the left side of the receiver. Alternatively, a left-handed shooter may release the bolt by pulling the rubber-coated charging handle to rear a short distance.

The SG 550 has a side-folding skeletonized buttstock (folds to the right side of the receiver) and a lightweight aluminium bipod that folds into grooves in the lower handguard. The hinged stock is firmly locked in the folded position by a socket in the butt which clips into a plastic stud on the handguard; a firm pull will release the stock which is then swung into the closed position and locked by a button catch. A collapsible side-folding stock is also available. The stock, pistol grip, and handguards are made of a high-strength polymer, and are produced in either green or black colour options. The steel receiver housing and several other components are manufactured using stamping and welding; external steel surfaces are finished with a ceramic-reinforced enamel coat known as Ilaflon.

The heavy, cold hammer-forged barrel is screwed into the receiver and is equipped with a slotted "bird cage" type flash suppressor that is also used to launch rifle grenades (using standard, live ammunition) or attach a knife bayonet (the bayonet is supported by a lug located at the base of the gas block). The rifled barrel has 6 right-hand grooves and the Swiss Army specification 254 mm (1:10 in) rifling twist rate is optimized for Swiss military GP 90 ammunition. An export-oriented barrel with a 178 mm (1:7 in) twist rate is also available, designed to stabilize 5.56×45mm NATO rounds with the heavier SS109 and tracer projectiles.

All rifles are test fired for accuracy and function prior to leaving the factory at the manufacturer's underground 300 m test range. Random new rifles out of production were tested on a machine rest. In a 24 single shot string starting with a cold weapon and using GP 90 ammunition, the R50 or 50% windage and elevation dispersion of any individual weapon must have been within an  group at 300 m, the 50% windage and elevation dispersion must have averaged . The employed circular error probable method cannot be converted and is not comparable to US military methods for determining rifle accuracy. When the R50 results are doubled the hit probability increases to 93.7%.

The gas system's components are made of stainless steel. The barrel, bolt, bolt carrier, and firing pin are all made with steel that has been gas nitrided, hardened and tempered. The bolt and carrier, along with most other components internal to the receiver undergo a phosphating process.

Sights

The sights are similar to those on some Heckler & Koch weapons, such as the HK G3 or HK MP5. The sights consist of a rear, rotating diopter drum soldered to the receiver and a hooded front post installed in the gas block. The rear sight has an open notch setting marked "1" designed for immediate firing up to 100 m but also contains apertures with settings "2", "3" and "4" corresponding to 200, 300 and 400 m firing ranges. The 400 m setting has a removable iris for sportive shooting. For night use, the dedicated "1" notch setting in the rear sight drum is provided with two self-luminous tritium-powered inserts fitted laterally on each side of the notch and additionally in a flip-up post attached to the foresight. When firing rifle grenades the front sight hood is aligned with the uppermost edge of the grenade's warhead, this provides an estimated point of impact up to 75 m. The rifle grenades intended for this purpose were FN/Luchaire Type 58-N bullet-though anti-tank grenades.

For designated marksman use, the SG 550 is equipped with a Kern 4×24 telescopic sight on a quick-detachable mount. The sight weighs  and includes a variety of features, such as STANAG 2324/MIL-STD-1913 compliant mounting components, a Bullet Drop Compensation (BDC) elevation adjustment knob for ranges from 100 to 600 m, a tritium-illuminated reticle that enables target acquisition in low-light conditions and a diopter eyesight correction adjustment. Included with the sight is a lens hood for mounting on the ocular that reduces image quality-impairing stray light and a gray filter for glare reduction. The basic model of this optical sight was already used on the Stgw 57.

The upper receiver can accept quick-detachable rails and adapters used to mount optics (STANAG 2324 compliant). The scope mounting system consists of a centering hole located on the front face of the rear sight assembly and a dovetail-like mounting point at the front end of the receiver. Swiss Arms (respectively Brügger & Thomet) offer several types of quick-release scope mounts and Picatinny rails. A version of the rifle with an integral receiver-mounted Picatinny rail is also offered; in this configuration the weapon is fitted with flip-up emergency battle sights—a rear aperture sight which folds down into a recess in the rail and a folding front blade.

Accessories

Both the rifle and carbine come standard with a spare magazine, sling, cleaning kit and a loading aid for rapid magazine filling.

The full-sized SG 550/551 will accept SIG's 40 mm GL 5040/5140 grenade launcher (Swiss military designation: 40 mm Gewehraufsatz 97), which is mounted under the barrel via an eccentric latch and replaces the lower handguard. The grenade  launcher is a single-shot breech-loaded weapon that is supplied with a leaf sight that attaches to the rifle's rear sight base and enables accurate firing out to 200 m. The lightweight aluminium launcher weighs  unloaded, and is operated independently of the rifle. It can use a wide array of 40×46mm grenades, including extended range high-pressure types and non-lethal baton or anti-riot projectiles. The compact SG 552/553 can be fitted with smaller GL 5340 underbarrel grenade launcher.

An Stgw 90 bayonet can also be mounted to the rifle. The bayonet has an overall length of 310 mm and a muzzle ring diameter of 22 mm. The 177 mm long blade is single-edged and it has no fuller. The bayonets are manufactured exclusively for the Swiss Army by Victorinox and in the past by Wenger until Victorinox acquired Wenger in 2005. With a proper lug adaptor, the rifle will also accept a NATO-pattern KCB-77 (made originally by Carl Eickhorn of Solingen, West Germany) or the American M9.

Variants

SG 551

The SG 551 carbine has a short pattern  barrel, gas tube and piston compared to the SG 550. The handguards were also changed and the bipod removed. The SG 551 cannot be used with a bayonet or fire rifle grenades. The SG 551 comes in several specialized variants designed for use with security and special forces. Among those variants are:
 SG 551-1P police carbine, designed to engage point targets out to 300 m; equipped with a Hensoldt 6x42 BL telescopic sight and detachable cheek riser. 
 SG 551 SWAT carbine, coated with a corrosion-resistant finish and equipped with an optical sight mount used with a wide array of sights, and can also accept mission-critical accessories such as a bipod, laser pointer or tactical light.
 SG 551 LB carbine with an extended  barrel that enables the use of rifle grenades and a bayonet.

SG 552 Commando

The compact SG 552 Commando (full designation as the 552-2P) carbine was released in July 1998. It has a shorter  barrel (with an open, 3-prong flash suppressor) and gas tube, ventilated handguards and a redesigned bolt carrier group that was integrated with the piston rod to form a single moving assembly. The return mechanism has been moved to the rear of the receiver housing and its recoil spring is guided in a way analogous to that of the AK-47: on a steel guide rod (later models feature a polymer guide rod) resting against the lower receiver's rear surface under tension of the compressed recoil spring. Like the SG 550/551, this model can accept rails and accessories enabling the use of optics. A long barrel version of the SG 552 known as the SG 552 LB incorporates a  barrel with provision to fire rifle grenades and support a bayonet. The SG 552 models were discontinued in 2008 and replaced by the SG 553. Upgrade part kits are available to convert a SG 552 in to a SG 553.

SG 553

The SG 553 is an improved version of the SG 552 and was released in 2008. Even though it mostly resembles the SG 552, the SG 553 has one key advantage, the recoil spring is now wrapped around the piston rod as in the SG 550/551 models, which address several reliability issues encountered in the SG 552 and also allows the usage of the standard SG 550/551 charging handle. A long barrel version of the SG 553 known as the SG 553 LB incorporates a  barrel with provision to fire rifle grenades and support a bayonet. Further factory options for the SG 553 rifle series are an integrated receiver Picatinny rail and an adjustable butt stock. The SG 553 R is a variant chambered for the 7.62×39mm cartridge fed from AK family box magazines. There is also a .300 AAC Blackout variant of the SG 553 known as the SG 553 BK which was first shown at IWA OutdoorClassics in 2016.

SG 552-A1 
The SG 552-A1 is a SG 552 rifle that has been modified to function like the SG 553. The modifications are available as a conversion kit that includes a new bolt carrier, charging handle, recoil spring and gas tube.

SG 550-1 Sniper 
Another member of the SG 550 family is the SG 550-1 Sniper variant designed at the request of the Swiss Police. The new folding stock has an adjustable cheek piece and a spacer system on the butt, the ergonomic pistol grip's angle of inclination can be regulated, the forend was shortened, and the bipod features a height and cant adjustment mechanism. This model is no longer in production.

Civilian variants
The SG 550/551/552/553 are also available in semi-automatic only configurations, intended for the civilian shooting market. Among these variants are the SG 550/551/552 SP, PE 90 and SIG Sport rifles. The SG 550 series is available with either 178 mm or 254 mm (1:7 and 1:10 in) twist rate barrels. Rifles designated SG 55x-1 have a 254 mm (1:10 in) twist rate, while models marked SG 55x-2 have a 178 mm (1:7 in) twist rate. The ordinance GP 90 ammunition is optimized for use with the original Swiss 254 mm (1:10 in) rifling twist rate.

Due to import restrictions, the American civilian market required a partially American-made version assembled by SIG SAUER, Inc. in Exeter, New Hampshire. The SIG556 is designed to meet these requirements. One difference is a new aluminum lower receiver that accepts M16 STANAG magazines and an M4 telescoping buttstock. The barrel's twist rate is 178 mm (1:7 in).

There are many variants of this rifle offered for sale. The first variant was sold with an aluminum Picatinny rail on the upper receiver and a series of plastic rails on the handguard. The market pushed SIG to produce the rifle with the slimmer profile 551-type handguards and a hooded front sight; this version is marketed as the SIG556 Classic. Several folding stock models have been released as well as variants with railed forend combinations. Another variant is the SIG 556 DMR featuring a  barrel. SIG P556 pistol variants with 10-inch barrels are also available. In 2012 the SIG 556 R or SIG 556 Russian chambered for the 7.62×39mm cartridge and using AK-pattern box magazines was introduced. The first generation of SIG556R rifles had a number of performance issues that were later resolved in later production runs of the SIG556R.

In January 2014, SIG introduced the 556xi series rifles as an improvement to the 556 and 556R series rifles.

As of May 2017, SIG has discontinued the SIG556, SIG556R, and 556xi series of rifles and no longer displays those models on the products section of their website.

The SIG 522LR is a .22-caliber sporting rifle styled after the SG 551. It uses a simple blowback semi-automatic operating system and its barrel has a 406 mm (1:16 in) twist rate. Due to its operating principle, the rifle has no mechanical commonality with other SG 550 variants. The SIG522 accepts commonly available AR-style .22-caliber conversion magazines.

In the U.S, a variety of semi-automatic SwissArms firearms are available for sale.  Due to U.S. import regulations, they are imported as a pistol.

Regulation in Canada
On 27 February 2014, the Canadian semi-automatic "Classic Green" sporting rifle, also known as the Swiss Arms PE 90, was re-classified as a "prohibited weapon". The rifle had been popular  with hunters and gun enthusiasts, who until February 2014, only required a possession and acquisition licence to obtain the rifle. However, late in 2013, a gun dealer had imported some PE 90 rifles from Switzerland and brought them to Canada for sale. After some were sold, it was alleged that the rifles in question were of a variant not allowed in Canada (PE90). Upon investigation and examination by the RCMP, this was proven inconclusive, however, the RCMP went further and decided the versions in Canada were too close to the PE90 and reclassified the rifles and declared the entire model line prohibited, with possible confiscation for destruction. This caused outrage amongst owners and lobbyists, who felt that the RCMP exceeded their authority, and that such policy changes should be enacted by legislation. The National Firearms Association of Canada considered pursuit of the matter through the legal system. On 31 July 2015, the Canadian government overturned the reclassification and returned the Swiss rifles to the original classifications. On 1 May 2020, in the wake of the Nova Scotia attacks, the rifles were again reclassified as Prohibited Firearms via Order in Council.

Accuracy potential
The following tables list accuracy statistics for typical in service Stgw 90 rifles firing Swiss 5,6 mm Gw Pat 90 service ammunition obtained by firing from the bipod. The statistics were computed under the 1990s Swiss method for determining accuracy, which is more complex than Western methods which usually involve firing a group of shots and then measuring the overall diameter of the group. The Swiss method differs in that after a group of shots is fired into the target from a machine rest hits on the outer part of the target are disregarded, while only half of the hits on the inner part of the circles are counted (50% or R50), which significantly reduces the overall diameter of the groups.  The vertical and horizontal measurements of the reduced groups are then used to measure accuracy. This circular error probable method used by the Swiss and other European militaries cannot be converted and is not comparable to US military methods for determining rifle accuracy. When the R50 results are doubled the hit probability increases to 93.7%.

 R50 means the closest 50 percent of the shot group will all be within a circle of the mentioned diameter.
 R93.7 means the closest 93.7 percent of the shot group will all be within a circle of the mentioned diameter.
 For rapid single shot series (5 rounds quickly fired within 2.5 to 5 seconds) the dispersion doubles compared to single shot fire.
 In 3-round burst mode and fully automatic firing mode the dispersion quadruples compared to single shot fire.

The radius of a circle is half its diameter.

Acceptance accuracy requirements
The  R50 dispersion of  ×  from the above  table was also the accuracy standard any Stgw 90 had to pass, firing a 24-round group of a machine rest. Any result from an individual as such tested weapon, was not allowed to exceed a maximal R50 dispersion of  × .

Gallery

Users

See also
SIG SG 530
SIG SG 540
SIG Sauer SIG516
Gun politics in Switzerland
List of assault rifles
List of carbines
List of sniper rifles

References

Bibliography
Règlement 53.96 Fusil d'assaut 5,6 mm 1990

External links

Swiss Arms PE 90 brochure
Modern Firearms
Biggerhammer.net—portal for articles, information and manuals, etc. on the SIG Stgw 57/SG 510/AMT and SG 550 rifle series
SG 550/551 technical data and test documentation
The SIG SG 550 series—information, manuals and links
SG 550/551 instruction manual
SG 552 instruction manual
Swiss Armed Forces Stgw 90 manual 
The Guns of Venezuela

Carbines
Weapons and ammunition introduced in 1986
5.56 mm assault rifles
.300 BLK firearms
7.62×39mm assault rifles
Assault rifles of Switzerland
SIG Sauer rifles